William de la Pole, 1st Duke of Suffolk,  (16 October 1396 – 2 May 1450), nicknamed Jackanapes, was an English magnate, statesman, and military commander during the Hundred Years' War. He became a favourite of the weak king Henry VI of England, and consequently a leading figure in the English government where he became associated with many of the royal government's failures of the time, particularly on the war in France. Suffolk also appears prominently in Shakespeare's Henry VI, parts 1 and 2.

He fought in the Hundred Years' War and participated in campaigns of Henry V, and then continued to serve in France for King Henry VI. He was one of the English commanders at the failed Siege of Orléans. He favoured a diplomatic rather than military solution to the deteriorating situation in France, a stance which would later resonate well with King Henry VI.

Suffolk became a dominant figure in the government, and was at the forefront of the main policies conducted during the period. He played a central role in organizing the Treaty of Tours (1444), and arranged the king's marriage to Margaret of Anjou. At the end of Suffolk's political career, he was accused of maladministration by many and forced into exile. At sea on his way out, he was caught by an angry mob, subjected to a mock trial, and beheaded.

His estates were forfeited to the Crown but later restored to his only son, John. His political successor was the Duke of Somerset.

Biography

William de la Pole was born in Cotton, Suffolk, the second son of Michael de la Pole, 2nd Earl of Suffolk by his wife Katherine de Stafford, daughter of Hugh de Stafford, 2nd Earl of Stafford, KG, and Philippa de Beauchamp.

Almost continually engaged in the wars in France, he was seriously wounded during the Siege of Harfleur (1415), where his father died from dysentery. Later that year his older brother Michael, 3rd Earl of Suffolk, was killed at the Battle of Agincourt, and William succeeded as 4th earl. He served in all the later French campaigns of the reign of Henry V, and in spite of his youth held high command on the marches of Normandy in 1421–22.

In 1423 he joined Thomas, Earl of Salisbury in Champagne. He fought under John, Duke of Bedford, at the Battle of Verneuil on 17 August 1424, and throughout the next four years was Salisbury's chief lieutenant in the direction of the war. He became co-commander of the English forces at the Siege of Orléans (1429), after the death of Salisbury.

When the city was relieved by Joan of Arc in 1429, he managed a retreat to Jargeau where he was forced to surrender on 12 June. He was captured by a French squire named . Admiring the young soldier's bravery, the earl decided to knight him before surrendering. This dubbing has remained famous in French history and literature and has been recounted by the writer Alexandre Dumas. He remained a prisoner of Charles VII for two years, and was ransomed in 1431, after fourteen years' continuous field service.

After his return to the Kingdom of England in 1434, he was made Constable of Wallingford Castle. He became a courtier and a close ally of Cardinal Henry Beaufort. Despite the diplomatic failure of the Congress of Arras, the cardinal's authority remained strong and Suffolk gained increasing influence.

His most notable accomplishment in this period was negotiating the marriage of King Henry VI with Margaret of Anjou in 1444, which he achieved despite initial reluctance, and included a two years' truce. This earned him a promotion from Earl to Marquess of Suffolk. However, a secret clause was put in the agreement which gave Maine and Anjou back to France, which was to contribute to his downfall.

With the deaths in 1447 of Humphrey, Duke of Gloucester (shortly after his arrest for treason), and Cardinal Beaufort, Suffolk became the principal power behind the throne of the weak and compliant Henry VI. In short order, he was appointed Chamberlain, Admiral of England, and to several other important offices. He was created Earl of Pembroke in 1447, and Duke of Suffolk in 1448. However, Suffolk was suspected of responsibility in Humphrey's death, and later of being a traitor.

On 16 July he met in secret with Jean, Count de Dunois, at his mansion of the Rose in Candlewick Street, the first of several meetings in London at which they planned a French invasion. Suffolk passed Council minutes to Dunois, the French hero of the Siege of Orleans. It was rumoured that Suffolk never paid his ransom of £20,000 owed to Dunois. The Lord Treasurer, Ralph Cromwell, wanted heavy taxes from Suffolk; the duke's powerful enemies included John Paston and Sir John Fastolf. Many blamed Suffolk's retainers for lawlessness in East Anglia.

The following three years saw the near-complete loss of the English possessions in northern France (Rouen, Normandy etc.). Suffolk could not avoid taking the blame for these failures, partly because of the loss of Maine and Anjou through his marriage negotiations regarding Henry VI. When parliament met in November 1449, the opposition showed its strength by forcing the treasurer, Adam Moleyns, to resign.

Moleyns was murdered by sailors at Portsmouth on 9 January 1450. Suffolk, realizing that an attack on himself was inevitable, boldly challenged his enemies in parliament, appealing to the long and honourable record of his public services. However, on 28 January he was arrested, imprisoned in the Tower of London and impeached in parliament by the Commons. 

 

The King intervened to protect his favourite, who was banished for five years, but on his journey to Calais his ship was intercepted by the ship Nicholas of the Tower. Suffolk was captured, subjected to a mock trial, and executed by beheading. His body was later found on the sands near Dover, and was probably brought to a church in Suffolk, possibly Wingfield. He was interred in the Carthusian Priory in Hull by his widow Alice, as was his wish, and not in the church at Wingfield, as is often stated. The Priory, founded in 1377 by his grandfather the first Earl of Suffolk, was dissolved in 1539, and most of the original buildings did not survive the two Civil War sieges of Hull in 1642 and 1643.

Marriage and descendants
Suffolk was married on 11 November 1430 (date of licence), to (as her third husband) Alice Chaucer (1404–1475), daughter of Thomas Chaucer of Ewelme, Oxfordshire, and granddaughter of the notable poet Geoffrey Chaucer and his wife, Philippa Roet. In 1437, Henry VI licensed the couple to establish a chantry and almshouse for thirteen poor men at Ewelme, which they endowed with land at Ewelme and in Buckinghamshire, Hampshire and Wiltshire; the charitable trust continues to this day.

Suffolk's only known legitimate son, John, became the second Duke of Suffolk in 1463. Suffolk also fathered an illegitimate daughter, Jane de la Pole. Her mother is said to have been a nun, Malyne de Cay. "The nighte before that he was yolden [yielded himself up in surrender to the Franco-Scottish forces of Joan of Arc on 12 June 1429] he laye in bed with a nonne whom he toke oute of holy profession and defouled, whose name was Malyne de Cay, by whom he gate a daughter, now married to Stonard of Oxonfordshire." 

Jane de la Pole (died 28 February 1494) was married before 1450 to Thomas Stonor (1423–1474), of Stonor in Pyrton, Oxfordshire.

Jackanapes

Suffolk's nickname "Jackanapes" came from "Jack of Naples", a slang name for a monkey at the time. This was probably due to his heraldic badge, which consisted of an "ape's clog", i.e. a wooden block chained to a pet monkey to prevent it escaping. The phrase "jackanape" later came to mean an impertinent or conceited person, due to the popular perception of Suffolk as a nouveau riche upstart; his great-grandfather had been a wool merchant from Hull.

Portrayals in drama, verse and prose

Suffolk is a major character in two Shakespeare plays. His negotiation of the marriage of Henry and Margaret is portrayed in Henry VI, Part 1. Shakespeare's version has Suffolk fall in love with Margaret. He negotiates the marriage so that he and she can be close to one another. His disgrace and death are depicted in Henry VI, Part 2. Shakespeare departs from the historical record by having Henry banish Suffolk for complicity in the murder of Humphrey, Duke of Gloucester. Suffolk is murdered by a pirate named Walter Whitmore (fulfilling a prophecy given earlier in the play proclaiming he will "die by Water"), and Margaret later wanders to her castle carrying his severed head and grieving.
His murder is the subject of the traditional English folk ballad "Six Dukes Went a-Fishing" (Roud #78)
Suffolk is the protagonist in Susan Curran's historical novel The Heron's Catch (1989).
 He plays a role in many of the seventeen Dame Frevisse detective novels of Margaret Frazer, set in England in the 1440s.
Suffolk is a significant character in Cynthia Harnett's historical novel for children, The Writing on the Hearth (1971)
Suffolk is one of the three dedicatees of Geoffrey Hill's sonnet sequence, "Funeral Music" (first published in Stand magazine; collected in King Log, Andre Deutsch 1968). Hill speculates about him in the essay appended to the poems.
Suffolk is one of the main characters in Conn Iggulden's Wars of the Roses: Stormbird, about the end of the Hundred Years' War and the start of the Wars of the Roses.

See also
Battle of Jargeau
Battle of Patay
Battle of Cravant
Siege of Montargis
John and William Merfold
Jack Cade's Rebellion

Footnotes

References

Bibliography

External links

1396 births
1450 deaths
15th-century English Navy personnel
Lord High Admirals of England
101
William
Earls of Pembroke
Knights of the Garter
People executed by decapitation
People from Mid Suffolk District
Holders of the Honour of Wallingford
Military personnel from Suffolk
Impeached British officials